The 2015–16 Women's National Cricket League season was the 20th season of the Women's National Cricket League, the women's domestic limited overs cricket competition in Australia. The tournament started on 9 October 2015 and finished on 29 November 2015. South Australian Scorpions won the title for the first time after finishing second on the ladder and beating defending champions New South Wales Breakers in the final, ending the Breakers' 10-tournament winning streak. Ellyse Perry was named player of the tournament.

Ladder

Fixtures

Round 1

Round 2

Round 3

Final

Statistics

Highest totals

Most runs

Most wickets

References

Notes

Bibliography

External links
 Series home at ESPNcricinfo

 
Women's National Cricket League seasons
 
Women's National Cricket League